Vittina natalensis, common name spotted nerite, is a species of small freshwater snail with an operculum, an aquatic gastropod mollusk in the family Neritidae, the nerites. 

It returns to brackish waters to reproduce.

This is a popular aquarium snail, sold because it looks attractive and eats algae in freshwater tanks, but does not multiply under aquarium conditions. It requires a pH above 7.0 to thrive.

Distribution
This species is endemic to the coastal plain of East Africa -- Kenya, Mozambique, Somalia, South Africa, and Tanzania. Its specific name natalensis refers to the region of Natal, South Africa.

Human use
This species is a common choice of algae-eating snail among freshwater aquarists. In the aquarium trade, the striped shell of this species has caused it to be known as the tiger snail, zebra snail, or zebra nerite. (The name zebra nerite is however misleading, because there are several species of nerite that have that common name, including Puperita pupa, a small marine nerite from the tropical western Atlantic.) The stripes in some individuals may display as zigzags, dashes or spots.
In an aquarium, the shell of this species grows to about 2.5 cm (one inch) in diameter. This snail prefers an aquarium temperature of 22 to 26 °C.

References

 Eichhorst T.E. (2016). Neritidae of the world. Volume 2. Harxheim: Conchbooks. Pp. 696-1366

External links
 eeve, L. A. (1855-1856). Monograph of the genus Neritina. In: Conchologia Iconica, or, illustrations of the shells of molluscous animals, vol. 9, pls 1-37 and unpaginated text. L. Reeve & Co., London.

Neritidae
Gastropods described in 1845
Freshwater snails of Africa
Taxobox binomials not recognized by IUCN